Oh! My Lady is a 2010 South Korean television series starring Chae Rim and Choi Si-won. It aired on SBS from March 22 to May 11, 2010. It is a romantic comedy about a top star who finds himself living with his manager, a 35-year-old woman who is trying to earn money to get custody of her child.

Plot
A spunky 35-year-old housewife, Yoon Gae-hwa (Chae Rim), takes on the job of house cleaner to prickly top star Sung Min-woo (Choi Siwon) in order to earn enough money to regain custody of her child from her ex-husband. Romantic hijinks and hilarity ensues when they find themselves in an awkward living situation as Min-woo pays Gae-hwa to take care of his illegitimate daughter, Ye-eun.

Cast
Chae Rim as Yoon Gae-hwa
Choi Si-won as Sung Min-woo 
Lee Hyun-woo as Yoo Shi-joon
Moon Jeong-hee as Han Jung-ah
Park Han-byul as Hong Yoo-ra
Kim Kwang-kyu as Han Min-kwan
Kim Hee-won as Jung Yoon-seok
Yoo Tae-woong as Kim Byung-hak
Yoo Seo-jin as Lee Bok-nim
Hwang Hyo-eun as Oh Jae-hee
Heo Joon-seok as Choi Tae-goo
Hong Jong-hyun as Park Jin-ho
Bang Joon-seo as Kim Min-ji
Kim Yoo-bin as Ye-eun
Lee Dae-yeon as Eom Dae-yong
Chu Heon-yeob as Chae Ho-sepk
Sulli as Min-woo's runway partner (cameo, ep 1)
Lee Han-wi as director (cameo, ep 1)
Jeon Hye-jin as actress (cameo, ep 1)
Na Young-hee as Gae-hwa's former boss (cameo, ep 1)
Jessica Jung as herself (cameo, ep 7)
Choi Soo-young as herself (cameo, ep 7)
Kim Hyo-yeon as herself (cameo, ep 7)
 Sung Hyuk

Ratings
The first episode of Oh! My Lady scored 10 percent according to TNS Korea and 11.5 percent by AGB Nielsen Media Research.

Soundtrack
 그대인형 (You're a Doll) - Sunny (Girls' Generation)
 못났죠 (Aren't I Stupid?) - Jo Seong-wook
 Love Is - 4men
 도시의 천사 - DJ Ahn Kwa-jang
 꽃은 핀다 
 그대 인형 (You're a Doll) (Scat ver.) - Gong Bo-kyung
 못났죠 (Aren't I Stupid?) (Guitar ver.)
 슬픈 미소
 Love Is (Bossanova ver.)
 도시의 천사 (Inst.)
 못났죠 (Aren't I Stupid?) - Choi Siwon

Awards and nominations

References

External links
 Oh! My Lady official SBS website 
 
 

Seoul Broadcasting System television dramas
2010 South Korean television series debuts
2010 South Korean television series endings
South Korean romantic comedy television series
Television series by Pan Entertainment